The yellow-spotted salamander (Pseudohynobius flavomaculatus) is a species of salamander in the family Hynobiidae,  endemic to China, where it is known from Nanchuan in Chongqing (formerly Sichuan), Suiyang in Guizhou, Lichuan in Hubei, and Sangzhi in Hunan Province. However, genetic methods have revealed cryptic species within the  Liua–Pseudohynobius complex, and the actual distribution of the yellow-spotted salamander is turning out to be different. Only animals from Lichuan in Hubei and Sangzhi have been positively identified as being yellow-spotted salamanders, whereas animals collected from Nanchuan were described as a new species, P. jinfo, by Wei et al. in 2009.

References

Further reading
 
 

Pseudohynobius
Amphibians of China
Endemic fauna of China
Taxonomy articles created by Polbot
Amphibians described in 1978